Haim Yehuda (9 November 1917 – 1985) was an Israeli politician who served as a member of the Knesset for Mapam between 1955 and 1960.

Biography
Born in Cairo in Egypt, Yehuda was a member of the Egyptian Communist Party. He joined the British Army during World War II, and made aliyah to Israel in 1948, where he joined Mapam. He was elected to the Knesset on the party's list in 1955, and was re-elected in 1959. However, he resigned his seat on 10 July the following year, and was replaced by Yosef Kushnir. He also served as head of Beit Dagan local council.

He died in 1985.

References

External links

1917 births
1985 deaths
Politicians from Cairo
Egyptian Jews
Egyptian communists
Jewish socialists
British Army personnel of World War II
Egyptian emigrants to Israel
Mapam politicians
Members of the 3rd Knesset (1955–1959)
Members of the 4th Knesset (1959–1961)